Lane-Bennett House, also known as the Joe Bennett House, is a historic home located near Raleigh, Wake County, North Carolina.  The original section was built in 1775, and is a one-story, "L"-shaped, Georgian-style frame dwelling. The original three bay section is covered by a very steep gable roof and has a shed roofed front porch.  The house was moved to its present location in 1980, along with a contributing smokehouse, and subsequently restored.

It was listed on the National Register of Historic Places in 1983.

References

Houses on the National Register of Historic Places in North Carolina
Georgian architecture in North Carolina
Houses completed in 1775
Houses in Wake County, North Carolina
National Register of Historic Places in Wake County, North Carolina